The Fabra Observatory (obs. code: 006) is an astronomical observatory located in Barcelona, Catalonia, Spain pointed towards the south at 415 metres above sea level (latitude: 41,4184° N; longitude: 2,1239° E). 

It was established in 1904 and belongs to the  Royal Academy of Science and Arts of Barcelona. Its main activity is the study of asteroids and comets. It is the fourth oldest observatory in the world that is still functioning.

It is where the comet 32P/Comas Solà was discovered by Josep Comas Solà.

Telescope 
The double refractor was built by Mailhat, Paris, in 1904. The visual instrument (the lower of the two tubes) has an aperture of 38 cm and a focal length of 6 meters (f/15.8). The photographic instrument also has an aperture of 38 cm, but a shorter focal length of 4 meters (f/10.5).

See also 
 Ramón Jardí i Borrás

References

External links 
 Fabra Observatory
 Official website of Fabra Observatory
 Official website of the robotic Fabra-Montsec Observatory where the Baker-Nunn camera will be installed
 Obsfabra Asteroid

Astronomical observatories in Catalonia
Astronomical observatories in Spain
Meteorological observatories
Sarrià-Sant Gervasi
Buildings and structures in Barcelona
Buildings and structures in Spain
Architecture of Barcelona
Education in Barcelona
Education in Catalonia
Catalonia
Tourist attractions in Barcelona
Great refractors
Double telescopes
Science and technology in Catalonia
Seismology
Tourism in Spain
1904 establishments